William Corbus (October 5, 1911  – January 8, 1998) was an American football guard who played for Stanford University.

College career
Nicknamed The Baby-Faced Assassin due to his youthful appearance and athletic ferocity, Corbus, who acted as placekicker as well as offensive lineman, was Stanford's first two-time All-American in 1932 and 1933.

In 1933, Corbus kicked two late field goals to defeat USC 13-7, helping to fulfill a promise made by his teammates from the class of 1936—a group known as the Vow Boys—to never again lose to USC. That year, Corbus helped Stanford the first of three straight Rose Bowls before graduating as an honor student and student body president.

After football
Corbus played in the era before the NFL draft, and did not continue in professional football. He worked for the A&P grocery store chain, retiring as vice-chairman in 1977. He was inducted into the College Football Hall of Fame in 1957 and is a member of the Stanford Athletic Hall of Fame.  His high school alma mater, Vallejo high school, named their football stadium for him. He died in San Francisco, California in 1998.

References

1911 births
1998 deaths
All-American college football players
American football guards
College Football Hall of Fame inductees
Players of American football from San Francisco
Stanford Cardinal football players
The Great Atlantic & Pacific Tea Company
American football placekickers